The pulmonary wedge pressure (PWP), also called pulmonary arterial wedge pressure (PAWP), pulmonary capillary wedge pressure (PCWP), pulmonary artery occlusion pressure (PAOP), or cross-sectional pressure, is the pressure measured by wedging a pulmonary artery catheter with an inflated balloon into a small pulmonary arterial branch. It estimates the left atrial pressure.

Pulmonary venous wedge pressure (PVWP) is not synonymous with the above; PVWP has been shown to correlate with pulmonary artery pressures in studies, albeit unreliably.

Physiologically, distinctions can be drawn among pulmonary artery pressure, pulmonary capillary wedge pressure, pulmonary venous pressure and left atrial pressure, but not all of these can be measured in a clinical context.

Noninvasive estimation techniques have been proposed.


Clinical significance

Because of the large compliance of pulmonary circulation, it provides an indirect measure of the left atrial pressure.

For example, it is considered the gold standard for determining the cause of acute pulmonary edema; this is likely to be present at a PWP of >20mmHg. It has also been used to diagnose severity of left ventricular failure and mitral stenosis, given that elevated pulmonary capillary wedge pressure strongly suggests failure of left ventricular output.

Traditionally, it was believed that pulmonary edema with normal PWP suggested a diagnosis of acute respiratory distress syndrome (ARDS) or non cardiogenic pulmonary edema (as in opiate poisoning).  However, since capillary hydrostatic pressure exceeds wedge pressure once the balloon is deflated (to promote a gradient for forward flow), a normal wedge pressure cannot  conclusively differentiate between hydrostatic pulmonary edema and ARDS.

Physiological pressure: 6–12 mm Hg.

References

External links
 Overview at cvphysiology.com
 

Diagnostic intensive care medicine
Medical terminology
Medical tests
Cardiovascular physiology